The 5th Dallas-Fort Worth Film Critics Association Awards honored the best in film for 1999.

Winners
Best Actor: 
Kevin Spacey - American Beauty
Best Actress: 
Hilary Swank - Boys Don't Cry
Best Director: 
Sam Mendes - American Beauty
Best Picture: 
American Beauty
Best Supporting Actor: 
Haley Joel Osment - The Sixth Sense
Best Supporting Actress: 
Julianne Moore - Cookie's Fortune

References

External links
Dallas-Fort Worth Film Critics Association official website

1999
1999 film awards